This is about the planned bill introduced in 2011. For other proposed bills of the same name, see Succession to the Crown Bill

The Succession to the Crown Bill was a proposed piece of United Kingdom legislation which aims to alter the laws of succession to the British throne.

It was introduced to the House of Commons on 18 January 2011 by Labour MP Keith Vaz under the Ten Minute Rule, and was intended to "remove any distinction between the sexes in determining the succession of the throne"  by replacing the current system of male primogeniture in succeeding to the throne of the United Kingdom with absolute cognatic primogeniture. It was due to have received its Second Reading on 9 September, however, the second reading did not occur on that date, and was instead rescheduled for 25 November 2011.

On 28 October 2011, it was announced by the heads of government of the 16 Commonwealth realms which share Elizabeth II as head of state that such a change in the law will soon be effected in all 16 independent nations, including the United Kingdom. Prime Minister David Cameron said that an Act of Parliament will amend the Act of Settlement 1701, the Royal Marriages Act 1772 and the Bill of Rights 1689 to establish absolute cognatic primogeniture for the descendants of Charles, Prince of Wales. The announcement in December 2012 that the Duchess of Cambridge was expecting her first child led to the publication of a new, government sponsored Succession to the Crown Bill.

References

2011 in British politics
Proposed laws of the United Kingdom
Succession to the British crown
2011 in British law